This is a list of singles that reached number one on the Spanish Music Charts during the 1980s.

Number-one singles

References
 Sólo éxitos: año a año, 1959–2002. Fernando Salaverri. Fundación Author-SGAE, 2005. .
 Promusicae website
  Discomania Magazine - in Spanish-

Number-one singles
Spain
1980s